The Naples–Portici railway was the first Italian railway line, built by the Bayard Company and opened in 1839. It now forms part of the Naples–Salerno line.

Geography
It ran from the current site of Corso Garibaldi in Naples to the royal palace at Portici, at the foot of Mount Vesuvius, now used by the Faculty of Agriculture of the University of Naples Federico II.

History
The line was promoted by a Frenchman, Armand Bayard de la Vingtrie, who received a concession to build it in February 1837 from King Ferdinand II of the Two Sicilies. The line was built of wrought iron rails mounted on large cubic stone sunk into the ground (as the system of using wooden sleepers to distribute weights had not been invented) and gauge was maintained from time to time with transverse bars. 

Three steam locomotives were imported from Longridge and Co of England: two 2-2-2 locomotives for passenger traffic, named Bayard and Vesuvio, and one locomotive for goods traffic; rolling stock was built locally. The king opened the first  of the line was from Naples to Portici on 3 October 1839. By the end of 1839, it had carried 131,116 passengers. It was extended to Castellammare di Stabia in 1842 and Nocera in 1844.

References

Railway lines in Campania
Railway lines opened in 1839
Railway companies established in 1837
Portici